The Italian Wine & Food Institute is a non-profit organization founded in 1983. The headquarter is in New York City and its president is Lucio Caputo. The institute's goal is the enhancement of the image and prestige of Italian wines, gastronomy and food products in the United States. Gala Italia is the most important initiative organized by the institute to promote the best Italian wine & food.

References

Sources
Wine News, March 4, 2015
Wine News, February 25, 2015
America Oggi, February 17, 2015, pag. 15
America Oggi, February 20, 2015, pag. 15
America Oggi, February 21, 2015, pag. 15
http://iwfinews.com/about-us/the-institute/

Non-profit organizations based in the United States
Italian culture